This is a list of census-designated places in the state of Indiana, United States of America.

 

A
 Aberdeen - Porter County
 Americus - Tippecanoe County
 Arlington - Rush County
 Avoca - Lawrence County

B
 Bass Lake – Starke County
 Blanford - Vermillion County
 Bright – Dearborn County
 Buck Creek - Tippecanoe County
 Buffalo – White County
 Burns City - Martin County
 Butlerville - Jennings County

C
 Canaan - Jefferson County
 Clarksburg - Decatur County
 Coalmont - Clay County
 Colburn - Tippecanoe County
 Collegeville – Jasper County
 Cordry Sweetwater Lakes - Brown County
 Country Squire Lakes - Jennings County

D
 Deputy - Jefferson County
 Dover Hill - Martin County
 Dubois - Dubois County
 Dunlap – Elkhart County

E
 East Enterprise - Switzerland County
 Emison - Knox County

F
 Fish Lake - LaPorte County
 Florence - Switzerland County
 Fontanet - Vigo County
 Freelandville - Knox County
 Freetown - Jackson County

G
 Galena – Floyd County
 Granger – St. Joseph County
 Grissom Air Reserve Base - Cass County and Miami County

H
 Hanna - LaPorte County
 Harlan - Allen County
 Harrodsburg - Monroe County
 Hatfield - Spencer County
 Hayden - Jennings County
 Henryville – Clark County
 Herbst - Grant County
 Heritage Lake - Putnam County
 Hidden Valley – Dearborn County
 Highland – Vanderburgh County
 Hoagland - Allen County
 Howe - LaGrange County
 Hudson Lake - LaPorte County

I
 Idaville - White County

J
 Jalapa - Grant County

K
 Kent - Jefferson County
 Kimmell - Noble County
 Koontz Lake – Marshall County and Starke County

L
 Lake Dalecarlia – Lake County
 Lake Holiday - Montgomery County
 Lake Santee - Decatur County and Franklin County
 Lake Village – Newton County
 Lakes of the Four Seasons – Lake County and Porter County
 Laketon - Wabash County
 Landess - Grant County

M
 Manilla - Rush County
 Melody Hill – Vanderburgh County
 Memphis – Clark County
 Metamora - Franklin County
 Mexico – Miami County
 Mier - Grant County
 Milroy - Rush County
 Montmorenci - Tippecanoe County

N
 New Goshen - Vigo County
 New Paris – Elkhart County
 New Salisbury - Harrison County
 New Trenton - Franklin County
 New Washington – Clark County
 North Terre Haute – Vigo County
 Norway – White County
 Notre Dame - St. Joseph County

O
 Oak Park – Clark County
 Otwell - Pike County
 Owensburg - Greene County

P
 Painted Hills - Morgan County
 Parkers Settlement – Posey County
 Point Isabel - Grant County
 Purdue University - Tippecanoe County

R
 Raglesville - Daviess County
 Ragsdale - Knox County
 Rolling Prairie - LaPorte County
 Roselawn – Jasper County and Newton County

S
 Saint Bernice - Vermillion County
 Saint Mary-of-the-Woods - Vigo County
 Saint Meinrad - Spencer County
 Salt Creek Commons - Porter County
 San Pierre – Starke County
 Scipio - Jennings County
 Scotland - Greene County
 Shelby - Lake County
 Shepardsville - Vigo County
 Shorewood Forest - Porter County
 Simonton Lake – Elkhart County
 Sims - Grant County
 Smithville-Sanders - Monroe County
 Somerset - Wabash County
 South Haven – Porter County
 Star City – Pulaski County
 Stockwell - Tippecanoe County

T
 Taylorsville – Bartholomew County
 Taylorville - Vigo County
 Tecumseh - Vigo County
 Toad Hop - Vigo County
 Tri-Lakes – Whitley County

V
 Vallonia - Jackson County
 Van Bibber Lake - Putnam County

W
 Waldron - Shelby County
 West Point - Tippecanoe County
 Westphalia - Knox County
 Wheeler - Porter County
 Williams - Lawrence County

See also

 List of cities in Indiana
 List of towns in Indiana
 List of metropolitan areas in Indiana
 List of Micropolitan Statistical Areas of Indiana

 
Census-designated places
Indiana